NCEE may refer to:

 National Center on Education and the Economy
 National College Entrance Examination
 National Center for Education Evaluation, part of the Institute of Education Sciences